Michael Chikong Seto (born 1967) is a Canadian forensic psychologist, sexologist, and author. He is director of Forensic Rehabilitation Research at the Royal Ottawa Health Care Group, where his research focuses on pedophilia, sexual offenses committed against children, child pornography, risk assessment, offenders with mental disorders, psychopathy, and program evaluation.

He is editor in chief of Sexual Abuse: A Journal of Research and Treatment, the official journal of the Association for the Treatment of Sexual Abusers, and an associate editor of the Archives of Sexual Behavior, the official journal of the International Academy of Sex Research. He also serves on the editorial board for the journal Law and Human Behavior, the official journal of the American Psychology-Law Society, as well as the Journal of Sex Research. He is an associate professor at the University of Toronto and holds cross-appointments to Toronto Metropolitan University, Carleton University, and the University of Ottawa.

Career 
Seto received a B.Sc. (1989) in biopsychology from University of British Columbia, completed his M.A. (1992) and Ph.D. (1997) in clinical psychology at Queen's University, Kingston, Ontario, Canada.  He worked at the Centre for Addiction and Mental Health (and its predecessor, the Clarke Institute of Psychiatry) from 1994 to 2008, before moving to the Royal Ottawa Health Care Group in 2008, first as a consultant and then as the director of Forensic Rehabilitation Research.

He serves as Scientific Advisor to Thorn, a company that partners across the tech industry, government and NGOs and leverage technology to combat predatory behavior, rescue victims, and protect vulnerable children. Thorn is co-Founded by Ashton Kutcher and Demi Moore.

Research 
Seto has been noted as "one of the foremost authorities" on adolescent sex offenders. Much of his research has focused on the psychological characteristics of sex offenders, their risk for reoffending, and the relationship between paraphilias and sexual offending. He has suggested in his book on pedophilia and sexual offending that perhaps 3% of men are sexually attracted to prepubescent children. Pedophilia is related to sexual offending against children, but they are not synonymous: Some pedophiles are not known to have ever committed sexual offenses against children, and some offenders are not pedophiles, motivated instead by high sex drive, criminality, or opportunism. Controversially, Seto has suggested that pedophilia can be understood as a sexual orientation with regard to age, just as heterosexuality, bisexuality, or homosexuality can be understood as sexual orientations with regard to gender.
 
In his research on online offending, Seto has discovered that there may be a closer link between pedophilia and child pornography use than between pedophilia and sexual offending against children directly. This does not mean pedophilia is the only motivation, but it does appear to be the most important. Despite this strong association with pedophilia, online sexual offenders appear to be at relatively low risk of reoffending, suggesting other factors such as personality must be involved. In related research, he and his colleagues have demonstrated that the same kinds of risk factors are valid for online offenders as they are for conventional contact offenders, including age, criminal history, substance use, and sexual attraction to children. This research is summarized in his book on online sexual offending.

Views 
In describing pedophiles, Seto emphasizes that there are few outward signs.  He told USA Today, "People would feel better if there was a profile, but there really isn't." "It can be a priest, a coach, or a teacher. It could be a person who is a trusted member of the community. They are employed. They have friends. It doesn't fit with the idea that this person is different in some way that we could notice and protect ourselves." Serial child molesters seek out vulnerable children and cultivate relationships with them, Seto said.  "They are not picking children at random." Rather, "They are seeking out children who will be more receptive to their approach—children who may be socially isolated, impoverished, lacking a father figure."

Seto described child pornography offenders as often being socially isolated, spending long stretches of time online, and being secretive about their online activities. "Several studies have suggested that child pornography offenders become increasingly involved online, sometimes spending hours every day searching for more content, as well as spending time on related sites" like youth-oriented forums or chat rooms, he said.  There also appears to be an age difference, according to Seto: "People on average under 35 are more familiar with the technology than those who are over 35, and the arrests reflect that."

In 2007, Seto's research team received a $66,000 (Canadian) research grant to study child pornography offenders, comparing those who do with those who do not go on to commit future offences. Ontario politician George Smitherman criticized the study and the Ontario Mental Health Foundation for funding the project, because the study subjects would receive money for agreeing to participate ($60 Canadian).
Seto responded that he was unsurprised the study has generated controversy.  He said "I do understand why people are concerned about this, but I hope they don't lose sight of the fact that we're doing this research to understand pedophilia and sexual offending," and that it is standard practice to pay people to take part in clinical studies.  According to OMHF, "The new knowledge to be gained from the proposed study would contribute to our theoretical understanding of the origins of sexual offending against children, because it would help identify factors that influence the likelihood that someone with a sexual attraction to children will act upon that attraction."

References 

1967 births
Canadian sexologists
Canadian psychologists
Living people
University of British Columbia alumni
Queen's University at Kingston alumni
Writers from Ottawa
Place of birth missing (living people)
Academic staff of the University of Toronto